Jaromír E. Brabenec (born 4 August 1934 in , now part of Prague) is a Czech graphic designer and sculptor. He is the older brother of poet and musician Vratislav Brabenec.

In 1968 he left Czechoslovakia for Sweden. In 1968-1969 he studied at Konstfack in Stockholm. He returned to the Czech Republic after the Velvet Revolution.

His first solo exhibition took place in 1964 in Kolín. Since then he has exhibited in Stockholm (several exhibitions), Malmö (1977), Basel (1978), Göteborg (1979), London (1986) and Nyköping (1993), among other places. His work has been also represented in many group exhibitions.

In 2022, he illustrated Vratislav Brabenec's book Stromečky published by Vršovice2016.

References

External links

1934 births
Living people
Czech male sculptors
20th-century Czech sculptors
21st-century Czech sculptors
Czech graphic designers
Czech exiles
Artists from Prague